At the 2004 Summer Olympics in Athens, Greece, three disciplines of gymnastics were contested: artistic gymnastics (August 14–23), rhythmic gymnastics (August 26–29) and trampoline (August 20–21). The artistic gymnastics and trampoline events were held at the Olympic Indoor Hall and the rhythmic gymnastics events were held at the Galatsi Olympic Hall.

Artistic gymnastics

Format of competition
The competition format was largely the same as at the 2000 Summer Olympics.  All participating gymnasts, including those who were not part of a team, participated in a qualification round.  The results of this competition determined which teams and individuals participated in the remaining competitions, which included:

The team competition, in which the eight highest scoring teams from qualifications competed.  For the first time, each team of six gymnasts could only have three gymnasts perform on each apparatus, and all three scores counted toward the team total.
The all-around competition, in which only the twenty-four highest scoring individuals in the all-around competed.  For the first time, each country was limited to only two gymnasts in the all-around final.
The event finals, in which the eight highest scoring individuals on each apparatus competed.  Each country was limited to two gymnasts in each apparatus final.

Medalists - Men's Events

Medalists - Women's Events

Rhythmic gymnastics

Trampoline

Medal table

Participating nations

A total of 252 gymnasts from 45 nations competed at the Athens Games.

Controversies

The gymnastics competition had scoring controversies, most prominently with the South Korean competitor Yang Tae-young.

The Korean team contested Tae-Young's parallel bars score after judges misidentified one of the elements of his routine. The effect of this misidentification was that the start value was recorded as 9.9 rather than 10. The Court of Arbitration for Sport (CAS) dismissed the Korean Olympic Committee's appeal on the grounds that the appeal, coming after the end of competition, was made too late, and insufficient evidence of corruption or bad faith on the part of the judges was presented to overturn a strong preference for a "field of play" judgment rather than one made after the fact.

Further problems occurred in the men's horizontal bar competition. After performing a routine with six release skills in the high bar event final (including four in a row – three variations of Tkatchev releases and a Gienger), the judges posted a score of 9.725, placing Nemov in third position with several athletes still to compete. This was actually a fair judging decision because he took a big step on landing which was a two tenths deduction. The crowd became unruly on seeing the results and interrupted the competition for almost fifteen minutes. Influenced by the crowd's fierce reaction, the judges reevaluated the routine and increased Nemov's score to 9.762, but this did not improve his placement and he finished without a medal. 

The controversies led to the reconstruction of the scoring system which was implemented in 2006. The rule changes are credited as having encouraged more acrobatic activity and increasing difficulties on the high bar apparatus seen in later competitions.

See also

Gymnastics at the 2002 Asian Games
Gymnastics at the 2002 Commonwealth Games
Gymnastics at the 2003 African Games
Gymnastics at the 2003 Pan American Games
2003 World Artistic Gymnastics Championships

References

External links
 Official result book – Gymnastics Artistic
 Official result book – Gymnastics Rhythmic
 Official result book – Gymnastics Trampoline
 gymnasticsresults.com
 gymn-forum.net
 
 
 

 
2004 in gymnastics
2004 Summer Olympics events
2004
International gymnastics competitions hosted by Greece
Galatsi Olympic Hall events